Kalle Anders Berglund (born 11 March 1996 in Jämshög) is a Swedish middle-distance runner. He won the silver medal in the 1500 metres at the 2017 European Indoor Championships.

During the Bislett Games in Oslo on 13 June 2019, he broke the Swedish record on the one English mile (1609 metres) distance with the time 3.53,83 minutes. With that, he broke Anders Gärderud's record on the same distance, which was 3.54,45 minutes.

International competitions

Personal bests
Outdoor
400 metres – 48.20 (Espoo 2015)
800 metres – 1:46.85 (Cheboksary 2015)
1000 metres – 2:19.21 (Stockholm 2018)
1500 metres – 3:33.70 (Doha 2019) NR
One Mile – 3:53.83 (Oslo 2019)NR
Indoor 
400 metres – 51.19 (Karlskrona 2013)
800 metres – 1:47.62 (Växjö 2017)
1500 metres – 3:36.63 (Toruń 2019) NR
One mile – 4:01.00 (Athlone 2018)
3000 metres – 7:57.78 (Växjö 2020)

References

All-Athletics profile

1996 births
Living people
Swedish male middle-distance runners
People from Olofström Municipality
World Athletics Championships athletes for Sweden
Swedish Athletics Championships winners
Athletes (track and field) at the 2020 Summer Olympics
Olympic athletes of Sweden
Sportspeople from Blekinge County
21st-century Swedish people